TDD may refer to:

Science and technology
 Telecommunications device for the deaf, a device for text communication along a telephone line
 Test-driven development, a type of software development methodology
 Time-division duplex, the application of time-division multiplexing to separate outward and return signals
 LTE-TDD, a 4G telecommunications technology and standard
 Transdermal drug delivery, a method of delivering drugs through the skin and into the bloodstream

Other uses
 Transportation development district, a special-purpose district created in some US states
 Teniente Jorge Henrich Arauz Airport (IATA airport code), Trinidad, Bolivia
 Tai Nüa language (ISO639-3 code: tdd)